Lieutenant Colonel Sir George Drummond Ogilvie (1882 - 1966)  was in the Indian Political Service. He was agent to the Governor General in Rajputana from 14 October 1932 to April 1937. In 1938, in Sister Agnes's time, he was appointed house governor to King Edward VII's Hospital for Officers, London. He supervised the hospital's move from Grosvenor Gardens to Luton Hoo on the outbreak of the Second World War, and was responsible for the purchase of the house at Beaumont Street, where the hospital now stands, having opened in 1948. He was appointed Companion, Order of the Star of India (C.S.I.), and in 1936 he was knighted.

India
George Drummond Ogilvie was in the Indian Political Service. From 14 October 1932 to April 1937 he was responsible for the administration of the former province of British India, Ajmer-Merwara, as Chief Commissioner, in the capacity of agent to the Governor General in Rajputana.

King Edward VII's Hospital for Officers
In 1938, in Sister Agnes's time, he was appointed house governor to King Edward VII's Hospital for Officers, London. He supervised the hospital's move from Grosvenor Gardens to Luton Hoo on the outbreak of the Second World War, and was responsible for the purchase of the house at Beaumont Street, where the hospital now stands, having opened in 1948.

Family
He married Lorna Rome, the only daughter of Thomas Rome JP of Charlton House. They had one daughter, Elizabeth Vere Drummond Ogilvie, who succeeded him on the hospital council with the title secretary.

Honours
In 1936, he received a knighthood in the Order of the Indian Empire.

See also
List of Chief Commissioners of Ajmer-Merwara

References

Bibliography
Hough, Richard (1998). Sister Agnes: The History of King Edward VII's Hospital for Officers 1899-1999. London: John Murray. 

1882 births
1966 deaths
Companions of the Order of the Star of India
Indian Political Service officers
Knights Commander of the Order of the Indian Empire